In the mathematical field of differential geometry, an almost-contact structure is a certain kind of geometric structure on a smooth manifold. Such structures were introduced by Shigeo Sasaki in 1960.

Given such data, one can define, for each  in  a linear map  and a linear map  by

for any  in  Conversely, one may define an almost-contact structure as a triple  which satisfies the two conditions
  for any 
 

References 

 David E. Blair. Riemannian geometry of contact and symplectic manifolds. Second edition. Progress in Mathematics, 203. Birkhäuser Boston, Ltd., Boston, MA, 2010. xvi+343 pp. ,  

Differential geometry
Smooth manifolds